Ribe Katedralskole is a cathedral school in the town of Ribe, Denmark. The school was first mentioned in 1145, making it one of the oldest schools in the world. The oldest building still in use, Puggård, is from the fourteenth century. Except for churches, this is the oldest Scandinavian building still used for its original purpose.

Today the school is an independent school functioning as a modern high school (Danish: Gymnasium og HFkursus).

Famous alumni

References

External links
 School Website

Schools in Denmark
Cathedral schools
Katedralskole